Betty Brown from Auchinleck is a Scottish international indoor and lawn bowler.

Brown won the Women's singles at the 2001 World Indoor Bowls Championship defeating Marilyn Peddell in the final.

References

Living people
Scottish female bowls players
Year of birth missing (living people)
Indoor Bowls World Champions